Sergio Iván Atarama Martínez (born August 28, 1966) is a Peruvian lawyer and politician. A founding member of the Peruvians for Change (later Contigo) party, he served as Deputy Minister of Justice at the start of the Martín Vizcarra administration, under the ministry headed by Salvador Heresi.

Early life 
Born in the southern region of Ica, Atarama graduated from the University of San Martín de Porres with a bachelor's in law, and attained his Juris Doctor from the San Pedro National University, in Chimbote, Ancash.

Political career 
His experience in the public sector started at the municipalities of El Agustino District and San Miguel District, serving as a legal advisor. Due to Salvador Heresi's victory at the 2002 municipal elections of San Miguel, Atarama was elected councilman representing the Christian People's Party – National Unity Coalition. He was reelected twice, being his last term in the district representing Radical Change.

In June 2011, Atarama founded Peruvians for Change alongside Pedro Pablo Kuczynski and Salvador Heresi. At the 2016 general election, Atarama unsuccessfully ran for a seat in the Andean Parliament. Although the party's list placed second, PPK only managed one representative at the interregional legislature. That same year, at the start of the Kuczynski administration, Atarama was appointed under Minister of Housing, Edmer Trujillo, as Executive Director of the Our Cities Program.

Following Salvador Heresi's appointment as Martín Vizcarra's first Minister of Justice, Atarama was sworn as Deputy Minister. He lasted three months in office following Heresi's downfall upon the revelation of his involvement in the National Council of the Magistrature wiretapping scandal.

Atarama remained in Peruvians for Change as it changed its name to Contigo, but left following the outcome of the 2020 parliamentary snap election, where the party managed to place last and with 0.9% of the popular vote. In the 2021 general election, Atarama ran for a seat in the Peruvian Congress with Alliance for Progress for the constituency of Lima, but was unsuccessful.

References

1966 births
20th-century Peruvian lawyers
Peruvians for Change politicians
Living people
Alliance for Progress (Peru) politicians
Christian People's Party (Peru) politicians